The 6th IAAF World Half Marathon Championships was held on October 4, 1997, in the city of Košice, Slovakia. A total of 228 athletes, 144 men and 84 women, from 45 countries took part.
Detailed reports on the event and an appraisal of the results was given.

Complete results were published.

Medallists

Race Results

Men's

Women's

Team Results

Men's

Women's

Participation
The participation of 226 athletes (143 men/83 women) from 45 countries is reported.

 (1)
 (3)
 (2)
 (9)
 (4)
 (3)
 (7)
 (1)
 (3)
 (6)
 (5)
 (1)
 (10)
 (10)
 (7)
 (1)
 (6)
 (4)
 (9)
 (8)
 (10)
 (3)
 (4)
 (6)
 (1)
 (2)
 (2)
 (2)
 (3)
 (5)
 (6)
 (8)
 (10)
 (2)
 (7)
 (9)
 (5)
 (3)
 (3)
 (1)
 (8)
 (10)
 (10)
 (3)
 (3)

See also
 1997 in athletics (track and field)

References

External links
Official website

IAAF World Half Marathon Championships
Half Marathon Championships
World Athletics Half Marathon Championships
International athletics competitions hosted by Slovakia